Mohamed Safwat (born 19 September 1990) is an Egyptian tennis player. Safwat has been a regular player on the Egypt Davis Cup team since 2009. Safwat has won one singles and three titles in doubles on the ATP Challenger Tour. He is currently the Egyptian No. 1.

Professional career
In 2016, Safwat became the first Egyptian player since 1997 to reach the final of a Challenger tournament when he reached the final in Kenitra, where he lost to Maximilian Marterer in straight sets. He also reached the semifinals at the Challenger tournament in Launceston in 2017, eventually losing to Mitchell Krueger.

In 2018, Safwat beat No. 3 seed and top 100 player Jordan Thompson en route to his second Challenger singles final in Anning, where he lost to Prajnesh Gunneswaran.

Safwat qualified for his first Grand Slam at the 2018 French Open as a lucky loser, where he lost to Grigor Dimitrov in straight sets. He was the first man from Egypt to play in a Grand Slam tennis tournament's main singles draw in 22 years.

In January 2020, Safwat qualified for a Grand Slam main draw for the first time in his career at the 2020 Australian Open by defeating three opponents in the qualifications at Melbourne Park. It made him the first Egyptian since Ismail El Shafei in 1978 to feature in an Australian Open main draw.

In February 2020, Safwat won his first singles Challenger title at the Launceston International beating local Alex Bolt in the final, thereby becoming the first Egyptian to win a Challenger title in singles since Tamer El-Sawy in 1996 and took him to a career-high of World No. 130 in the ATP rankings on 10 February 2020.

National representation 
In 2018, Safwat was part of the Egyptian Davis Cup team to advance to the 3rd round of the Europe/Africa Zone II bracket for the first time since 1996.

Safwat made history for Egyptian sport at the Tokyo Olympic Games, where he made his debut, as the first Egyptian man to qualify for the Olympics in 2021 after he won the 2019 African Games.

Challenger and Futures finals

Singles: 48 (25–23)

Doubles: 21 (13–8)

Davis Cup ties played

22 ties played, 17 victories and 10 defeats in the singles ; 7 victories and 4 defeats in the doubles (from 2009 to end of 2018)

References

External links
 
 
 

1990 births
Egyptian male tennis players
Living people
Sportspeople from Cairo
Competitors at the 2019 African Games
African Games medalists in tennis
African Games gold medalists for Egypt
African Games silver medalists for Egypt
African Games bronze medalists for Egypt
Olympic tennis players of Egypt
Tennis players at the 2020 Summer Olympics